Q'illu Q'asa (Quechua q'illu yellow, q'asa mountain pass, "yellow mountain pass", also spelled Khellu Khasa) is a mountain in the Bolivian Andes which reaches a height of approximately . It is located in the Cochabamba Department, Arani Province, Vacas Municipality. It lies southwest of Qucha Quchayuq Urqu.

References 

Mountains of Cochabamba Department